The comic book series Spawn, published by Image Comics, and its many spin-offs such as an animated version contain a variety of characters – the allies of main character Spawn and the antagonists.

Main character
Spawn / Al Simmons – the protagonist. He is originally a CIA operative until he is betrayed by Jason Wynn and sent to hell. There he meets Malebolgia, agreeing to receive an opportunity to see his wife Wanda in exchange for becoming a hellspawn. Five years after his death, Spawn finds that his wife has married Terry Fitzgerald and with him had a daughter named Cyan. Now stuck on Earth, Spawn is watched over by the Violator, who eventually becomes his arch-nemesis. Realizing all this, Spawn turns on hell, protecting humanity from the war between heaven and hell.

Supporting cast
 Sam Burke – New York City Police Department (NYPD) detective and Twitch Williams's partner
 Twitch Williams – fully known as "Detective Maximillian 'Twitch' Percival Williams", Sam Burke's partner
 Eddie Frank – a young man, former host of the Redeemer and later becomes the Reaper.
 Andy Frank – Eddie Frank's younger brother
 Jim Downing – the former protagonist. He is a scientist. Jason Wynn, his boss, kills Jim Downing's wife and puts him in a coma until Simmons commits suicide. Downing becomes Spawn until issue 250. In issue 292, Downing returns to his former body because Simmons places his soul back in his body.
 Wanda Blake – Al Simmons's widow. After his death, she marries Simmons's best friend, Terry Fitzgerald, and has a daughter with him, Cyan. She keeps her maiden name both times when she marries. Later, she has twins with Terry, who happen to be reincarnations of God and Satan. In the resurrection version of the story, she is killed, and Spawn goes to hell to save her. She is named after Spawn creator Todd McFarlane's wife.
 Terry Fitzgerald – Wanda's husband and Al Simmons' former best friend. He is based on a real-life long-term employee and friend of Spawn creator Todd McFarlane.
 Mike the Messenger – the Archangel Michael, assisting Simmons under God's orders.
 Cyan Fitzgerald – Wanda Blake and Terry Fitzgerald's daughter. After her mother's death, she gains superpowers as a teenager and becomes Misery.
 Jake Fitzgerald (God) – One of Wanda and Terry's miracle twins. Issue 158 revealed that Jake is a reincarnation of God in the body of a normal human child. God is a former villain and the son of the Man of Miracles as well as the brother of Satan. The series's perception of God is a variation of the traditional Abrahamic story of God, although it shares many similarities with it. In Spawn: Armageddon, the name was changed to Goddess, and Malebolgia was her brother.
 Granny Blake, real name Mary Blake – Wanda Blake's grandmother. She has great faith and wisdom. Spawn confides in her, among a few others, when he returns from hell.
 K7-Leetha, full name Leetha of the 7th House of K – Spawn's shape-shifting costume. A neural parasite from the fourth circle of Hell, it bonds to him in a symbiotic partnership. Its origins were retconned in issue 252, where it is made from Al's victims.
 Man of Miracles – a mystery man who offers guidance to Spawn. He takes the form of several mortals at various times, including Jesus Christ. He is later retconned due to legal issues after the resurrection and because issue 250 depicted a variation on the traditional Abrahamic story of creation.
 Christopher Welland – a boy whose soul is sealed within Spawn's heart. He has taken the form of a young hellspawn and uses his powers to help Spawn. Also, he is the key to the Legion, who releases Christopher from Spawn.
 Nyx – a witch who helps Al Simmons regain his hellspawn powers. She betrays him so that she can journey to hell to save the soul of a friend. Nyx appears to be attuned to Greenworld. As of issue 169 ("Voodoo Child"), Nyx reconciles her conflicts with Spawn and regains her powers. She is instrumental in saving Spawn in issue 171 ("A Tale of Three Brothers: Remembrance") from demons called Sin Eaters. In an interview conducted by Comic Book Resources (CBR), Spawn writer David Hine reveals that Nyx's powers may be developing and that she is in love with Spawn.
 Hiroshi Kitamura – One of the lost souls within Spawn.
 Kumiko Kitamura – the granddaughter of Hiroshi and one of the lost souls.
 Marc Simmons – Spawn's brother, and an FBI profiler and field agent
 Marc Rosen – a journalist
 Susan Matthews – Marc Rosen's girlfriend
 Sara Johnston – a nurse who becomes Jim Downings's lover
 Richard Simmons – another one of Spawn's brothers. He is a minister, first revealed in issue 170 ("A Tale of Three Brothers: Hellhouse"). He runs a building where he and a companion show visitors films and depictions of people's most despicable acts in order to sway them from wrongdoing. The demons Ab and Zab open portals to Hell in his facility. Sin Eaters attack and feed on Richard Simmons and his companion and Spawn and Nyx save them. Due to the influence of Mammon disguised as Malefick, Richard Simmons is a former drug user. He harbors guilt for the unfortunate situation in which his brother Al Simmons is because he was not involved in the circumstances that led to Al stabbing the drug dealer Weasel. Even though Al shows compassion for Richard without anger, he is unable to forgive himself for his past wrongs. With the help of Mammon, he is voluntarily swallowed into hell. 
 Bobby – a homeless man who is Al Simmons's best friend in the first 70 issues. Bobby is later shot in the head, and Spawn revives him. He is one of the only two homeless people along with Bootsy to have appeared in several issues and have a storyline and a name. He has a wife and a daughter before he becomes homeless. When his wife dies, he becomes an alcoholic, losing everything he has, including his daughter. Saddened by his best friend Bootsy's death, he falls deeper into alcoholism, going as far as stealing a dead hobo's bottle and causing him to be suspected of murder. He does not appear and is never mentioned after Spawn made everyone, including Cogliostro, leave the alleys.
 Bootsy – first introduced as a homeless man, he is an undercover angel who watches over Spawn and makes reports to heaven about him. After a fight with The Heap, Spawn is killed. Bootsy revives him to prevent Armageddon. He is then abducted by other angels for interfering in the fate of humans.
 Medieval Spawn – a hellspawn of the medieval era. In the medieval era, he is a knight named Sir John of York, fighting during a civil war in England. He is released from service to King Henry II after he and three others mistakenly kill the Archbishop of Canterbury by misinterpreting the king's angry words. He is killed on a battlefield in Ireland by the king's bodyguards as he approaches him for forgiveness. For killing and furthermore enjoying it, John is sent to hell, where he makes a deal with Malebolgia. He returns to Earth several years in the future, clad in medieval-looking symbiotic armor. After he finds his own grave, he travels throughout England, doing good deeds in the hope that he would be redeemed. He is eventually slain by the demon hunter Angela. In issue 303, Medieval Spawn is revived. He would later possess Marc Rosen.
 Gunslinger Spawn- a hellspawn cowboy from the old west.
 Callindra – a young 200-year-old angel. Her first case is defending Angela from charges of treason.
 Anahita and Kuan Yin – two angels. They defend Angela by bringing Spawn to testify on her behalf. Both were once freelance employees of Angela.
 Angela – an angelic bounty-hunter. Sent against Spawn, she later befriended him. She was impaled with her own dual-bladed staff by Malebolgia. This episode led to Spawn taking her sword and cutting off Malebolgia's head. 
 Jade (Lisa Wu) – first introduced in the animated series as "Lisa Wu", she is a news reporter who investigates the alley murders at Rat City. She later helps Sam and Twitch find more information about the people responsible for the murderers, and also helps Wanda Blake understand her situation with the hellspawn. Jade is a bounty hunter who was sent to kill the hellspawn, befriending Spawn because she realizes that he is different than other hellspawn. She has been sent by the heavens for centuries to kill evil creatures, even being sent to kill Genghis Khan. Spawn later kills her, sending her to the Elysian Fields in order to escape two assassin warriors who were sent to kill her because Jade did not kill Spawn. Before her body is taken away by the assassins, Spawn asks if she would be at peace. One of the assassins answers, "Yes, something that you will never know, Hellspawn."
 Max Williams – Twitch Williams's son
 Earl – a new ally of Spawn whom he met at the gym
 Helen Williams – the wife of Twitch Williams
 Dr. K. C. McRory – Dubbed "Dr. Death" by the detectives, Dr. McRory is in charge of the crime scene investigation department at the precinct. She dislikes Sam Burke for his sloppy habits and abrasive personality but is friendly with Twitch Williams. She may be based loosely on the DC Comics character Carrie Kelley: they share initials in a different order and have matching glasses and hairstyle. She and Twitch live together for some time. McRory is killed accidentally by a fugitive bounty hunter.
 Haunt – the protagonist of a series of the same name, he appears as a supporting character in Spawn.
 Major Forsberg – a mentally ill veteran. He is trapped in an asylum. When Spawn contacts him for information, Forsberg gives him insight on Jason Wynn's projects. He later returns when he begs Spawn to kill him.
 Kenji Onozaka – a Japanese man who is friends with Al Simmons and Terry Fitzgerald. He has a wife and two children, who are part of Cyan's host family. He is killed by demons.
 Matsuko Onozaka – Kenji Onokaza's wife, and mother of Yoko and Yujiro. Along with the rest of her family, she is killed by demons. 
 Yoko Onozaka – the daughter of Kenji and Matsuko, and sister of Yujiro. After she is killed by demons, she appeared as a ghost to help Cyan defeat the demons.  
 Yujiro Onozaka – the brother of Yoko, and son of Kenji and Matsuko
 Ghost Girl – a ghost of a young woman killed by demons. She helps Cyan and Spawn kill the demons who were responsible for her death.
 Sadaharu – a ghost of a young boy killed by demons. He plays a similar role in fighting demons as Ghost Girl.
 Saya – a young woman assaulted by demons. Spawn saves her. 
 Phil Timpler – a restaurant worker. Until he dies, he is used for some time as the second Redeemer.
 Raptor – first appearing in issue 306 he was fighting to survive with his lover Claudiaz.
 Claudiaz – first appearing in issue 306 she was a survivor of a dark timeline alongside her lover Raptor.
 Craig Rowand – a private detective who was assisted to assist Sam and Twitch. He met Jim Downing as well as Sara Jothson and Marc Rosen.
 Simon- A ghost of a boy who died during the events of King Spawn was brought by the oracle to be tutor by Heap.
 Amy- Gunslinger's younger sister
 Alex- a young boy who bonded with komox
 Komox- a powerful entity who protects Alex
 Taylor Barlett- a young man who is gunsling's ally
 Natasha- a young woman who was protected by the scroched 
 Olexia- a friend of Natasha
 Jessica Priest – Former CIA agent. Al Simmons' killer and later second she-spawn becoming the leader of the scorched.
 Soul Crusher 2- Sergei Medvedev was a childhood friend of Natasha and was raised by the original soul crusher before Sergei killed him and took up the mantle. He is now member of the scorched team.
 Shaman Waya- an old friend of Gunslinger from the old west who stays alive for centuries due to his magic.
 Focus- A young man who was experimented on and gained super speed.
 The Scorched- a team of hellspawns,humans,and angels led by Jessica priest.
 Gaia- The Ruler of the Greenworld and god and satan's sister with her being one of mother's children.

Villains
 Malebolgia – the first main villain of the series and Former master of the eighth circle of Hell. Decapitated by Spawn. Exists now as something of a ghost possessing the Freak's necroplasmic body, gathering other parts of his divided being from people on Earth to fully become himself again.
 Jason Wynn/Disruptor – Former CIA director and Al Simmons' superior who gave the order to kill Simmons. Ruthless, corrupt, merciless, and at one point, one of the most powerful men on the planet. Currently, he has lost most of his influence with Spawn having eliminated most if not all his means of regaining power and was killed by Jim Downing. Later returns as the supervillain Disruptor.
 Violator (Clown) – a constant tormentor and the arch-nemesis of Spawn, pushing him to use his powers for the benefit of Hell. One of the five Phlebiac Brothers, demons from the eighth circle of Hell.
 The Redeemer– a holy opposite to the Hellspawn, created by the Star Chamber. There had been many different versions of the Redeemer with Jason Wynn being the first but later proved to be unworthy. Later on two new hosts were Phil Timper and Eddie Frank. There is now the fourth Redeemer.
 Mammon – a Forgotten One. One of the major Lords of Hell and the second primary antagonist of the series.
 Katie Fitzgerald (Satan) – the overarching  antagonist of the series and his origins that originally God and Satan were the children of the Man of Miracles but the retcons are based on Abrahamic origins. Katie Fitzgerald One of Wanda and Terry's miracle twins. Issue 158 revealed that Katie was literally evil incarnate, as she was actually Satan, the evil Lord of Darkness. Later reconnected in the later issues as a normal human girl. Satan was killed by Spawn.
Cogliostro/Sinn (Cog/Cain) – Spawn's former mentor and guide; former master of the eighth circle of Hell in which he later serves as his mentor again and then a villain. He would soon become Sinn in the later series as the third main antagonist.
 Brock Fennel – the third newscaster from the first issue who appeared a few times and was eventually revealed to be a demon in disguise.
 Overt-Kill – Seemingly unstoppable cyborg who fought Spawn to a standstill early in his career. Was defeated by a simple systems malfunction. Each time he is dismantled he comes back stronger and more dangerous than before.
 Tiffany – a warrior-Angel who replaced Angela in the hunt for Spawn. A member of an Angelic host known as the Amazon Warriors.
 Joe Frank – the Father of Eddie Frank and Andy Frank who abuses them and a cop until Eddie Kills him.
 Billy Kincaid – a pedophilic child-killer who was in turn killed by Spawn. He went on to serve as a lackey of Malebolgia and has returned from Hell multiple times to wreak havoc. He was stopped once by Spawn and most recently by young Christopher. 
 Bludd – a Vampire Lord in league with Clown.
 Margaret Love – a "philanthropist" who Simmons once knew as Soviet agent Nadia Vladova, specializing in mind control experiments with a high death/insanity rate. Spawn discovers her homeless shelter program is a cover for harvesting human heads for remote-controlled cyborgs as part of the arsenal for her ultimate solution to human greed, a worldwide nuclear assault. She dies after Spawn allows falling debris to kill her but launches one missile toward New York as she dies.She would later return in the scorched series alongside Necro Cop who see met in hell after he saved her and began a relationship with him.
 The Freak – an escapee from a mental asylum with multiple personalities. He is a sadistic murderer who believes his own delusions. Freak has tangled with Spawn and the Violator, and stole the bag of necroplasm that turned Eddie Beckett into The Heap. Spawn killed him with his own evil and he resided in Hell. A necroplasmic body was resurrected and is possessed by Malebolgia, but may contain the Freak's soul as well. The Freak later returns in #289 alive again.
 Simon Pure – the last leader of The Kingdom, a vampire cult that believed (incorrectly) that they were descended from the twelve apostles of Jesus, God's chosen race and awaited a cleansing in which the wicked would be wiped from the Earth and the vampires would rise to power. He and his followers were viewed with distaste by all other vampires. Simon Pure was a particularly religious zealot who took it upon himself to initiate the prophesied "cleansing", creating an army of 777 vampire warriors blinded by Pure and then gifted with a "second sight" to see sinners as marked. Simon sent the army into New York to slaughter all the sinners, but his plan was foiled when Spawn absorbed all of New York's sins into himself and lured The Kingdom to send themselves into a doorway made by the demons Ab and Zab.
 Zera – the queen of the Seraphim. Utterly insane.
 Lilly – First introduced in the animated series as a teenage girl arriving at a bus stop and involved in two more alley murders near Rat City investigated by Sam and Twitch. She is actually a vampire offered a deal by the heavens to kill the Hellspawn. She is later killed by Spawn with sunlight.
Ab and Zab – their real names are Abbadon and Zabraxas. They are minor opener-demons who serve the Lord of Hell. They have been both Spawn's enemy as well as minions and there is just some things about being on Earth they cannot get enough of... cigarettes, guns, booze, babes and any other vice you can think of. As of Spawn #170, "A Tale of Three Brothers: HellHouse", they are responsible for opening a rift to Hell, allowing the Sin Eater demons to attack humans.
Bingo – one of the recent Spawn villains and servants of Satan
Hellion – one of the new Spawn villains
Belial – a demon from hell.
Major Vale – a corrupt general.
John Sansker – a vampire monster.
Metatron – an angel that fought Spawn.
Katherne – an angel.
 Grace – the angel from the comics.
Soul Crusher – a new Spawn villain.
Decay – a new villain from the later issues.
King Spider – a new villain that Spawn and Malcom Dragon fought.
Gabrielle – a corrupt angel from heaven who put a hit on Spawn.
Celestine – an angel sent to kill Violator.
Godsend- an angel who is a member of the heaven equivalent of the four Horseman of the Apocalypse.
Mother Mary – a new villain spawn fought.
 Vindicator – the most expository of the Phlebiac Brothers. He guided Billy Kincaid through Hell to the eighth circle of Hell.
 Vandalizer – the most compact of the Phlebiac Brothers.
 Vacillator – the most indecisive of the Phlebiac Brothers.
 Vaporizer – the largest of the Phlebiac Brothers.
 The Forgotten Ones – Angelic creatures who did not choose sides in the Biblical Fall, and were banished by God.
 Chapel – Bruce Stinson. Mercenary, assassin, American hero. Former CIA agent, member of Youngblood. Helped to kill Al Simmons, his best friend. Retconned after Rob Liefeld left Image Comics.
 Antonio Twistelli – "Tony Twist" the infamous Mafia don of New York City. He has been making a play for the top and seeks to inherit the power of Don Bartino. Cruel, ruthless and smarter than he looks. Oversaw both Mafia Supersoldier projects. With Spawn and Violator causing so many problems in New York, his plans for advancement look to be in jeopardy.
 Tremor – the predecessor of Over-Kill. He is a failed prototype for the Mafia Supersoldier. The process turned him into a cybernetic monster resembling a large demon and for this he continues to wage his own personal war on the Mob. Depending on his mood, Spawn cannot be sure if he will be a friend or a foe when Tremor comes calling.
 The Curse – Phillip Krahn. Eccentric billionaire, religious zealot and one of Spawn's deadliest enemies
 Cy-Gor – a cybernetic mesh of metal and ape, but with a human brain. This government project knows no control nor pleasure except for the taste of blood.
 Urizen – the Dark God, Leveler of Hope and Destroyer of Dreams. He is based on the evil deity from William Blake's mythos.
 The Heap – Formerly Eddie Beckett, now a walking Heap, an agent of Greenworld made of trash and earth and animated by necroplasm
 Rafael – Current highest-ranking Angel on Earth, taking over as Gabrielle is called to answer for her failed scheme
The Disciple – Heaven's greatest warrior, and predecessor to the Redeemer
 Thamuz – a demonic Master of Torture who has vowed to unravel the secrets kept by Spawn
 Admonisher – a mercenary hired by Tony Twist to kill Violator
 Scott Mcmillian – a corrupt senator and father of Billy Kincaid
 Chief Banks – a corrupt police chief
 Merrick – from the animated series; a soldier of Jason Wynn.
 Hellspawn – a former human turned demon in the service of Hell
 Mark – a human turned demon called Mark of the Beast
 Gabriel – a corrupt angel
 Morana – a woman who was Wanda and Al's daughter but was retconned
 Simon Vesper – a demon looking for his own place in hell
 Victoria – an angel who fought Jim Downing who had become Spawn at the time but lost and later loses her wings she was also the Redeemers wife. She was turned into a vampire and was saved by the Redeemer.
 Hel – a former ruler in Hell who teamed up with Violator and possessed the corpse of Susan Williams for a while
 Solomon Pure – Solomon Pure is the possible Brother of Simon Pure and an associate of Bludd's
 Phlegethonyarre – a demon that appears in the Curse of Spawn series
 Brimstone – a demon from the video game Spawn: In the Demon's Hand
 Domina – an angel who guarded the gate to Urizen
 The Demon Croatoan – the villain of Batman/Spawn: War Devil
 Suture – a woman who was killed and reborn as an undead vengeful killer
 Wolfram – an undead walker who loosely follows Heavens orders
 The Kingdom – a group of Vampires led by Simon Pure
 Dawn – a teenage girl who is a vampire and a member of the Kingdom who had a relationship with Max williams
 Lucas – a friend of Dawn's and a member of the Kingdom
 The Rapture – a group of elite Angel warriors who are the equivalent of the Four Horseman of the apocalypse.
 Red-Sleeves – a Demon who came from Japan who Spawn and Cyan
 Shimazu – a demon from Japan who attacks Cyan and Spawn
 Tamura – a demon in the form of a human in Japan
 Ricky – a demon who takes a form of crows and female form
 Honolulu Jo – a demon who was a part of the Yakuza
 Okumatsu – an Angel who resides in Japan
 Urshrek – the Winter King and an evil god
 Mad One – a fallen angel featured in the SNES game. The Mad One kidnaps the souls of thirteen children, including Cyan, and fuses them into an 'Orb of Light', with the sole intent of using it to destroy Malebolgia. 
 The Heart of Heavens – a large angelic warrior first appearing in issue 306 hunting down Raptor and Claudiaz
 Extractor – a villain during Downing's time as Spawn
 Malcolm – a cyber mercenary who was encased by Jason Wynn
 Chretien DuSang De La Croix – One of the villains of Spawn: The Dark Age
 Guy DuBlanc – a villain in the Spawn: The Dark Ages series
 Sisters of the Morrigan – Three female villains who worship the Morrigan from Spawn: The Dark Ages
 Reaver – a rogue angel from the video game Spawn: Armageddon
 Dakota- a female villain with the abiity to control dinosaours.
 Jerchio- an undead villain who works with Disruptor.
 The New Breed- a monstrous demon and final boss in the SNES video game. Created by Malebolgia using the kidnapped souls of Cyan and twelve other children, kidnapped originally by the Mad One. After Spawn defeats the Mad One, Malebolgia sends the New Breed to Earth to feed on the innocence of the world.
 The Forsaken- A new villain who appears to be a darker version of the Redeemer. Eventually revealed to be the first of the redeemers but went mad after being rejected by god as the fire of heaven was not fully mastered. Later he was revealed to be Abel the brother of Cain aka Cogliostro aka sinn.
 Cordelia- A woman with a collection of monsters. She is later revealed to be a demon.
 The Oracle- A witch who came from greenworld debuted in the king Spawn series.
 Black Azazel- A fallen angel who is a member of Pslam 177.
 Sin Devourer- a new villain for the scorched series they are large alien monsters designed to hunt and kill its targets.
 Carnivore- a werewolf who fights against Gunslinger Spawn.
 K- The buyer and creator of the Sin-Devours.
 Theus- A Dark Angel who appears as a recurring foe for Gunslinger spawn
 Cyrus- an immortal man who was once allied with Theus
 Radcliffe Winterstone- a person who has a grugde against Gunnslinger for killing his family and transforms into a hulking warrior. His Family corrupted gunslinger's sister
 Omega Spawn- A hulking Hellspawn who went to conquer the galaxy.
 Plague Spawn- Plague Spawn was the prototype for future hellspawns until it escapes and resurfaces years later to terroize the world.
 Ordeal- a member of the court of priests and servant of the Nightmare Spawn.
 Nightmare Spawn- a winged hellspawn who appeared in the hellspawn series before making his full debut in the King Spawn series.
 Raven Spawn- A hellspawn who can control ravens first appeared in the hellspawn series before debuting in the King spawns series.
 Nercocop- An Artificial Hellspawn. Debuting in Spawn:Simony he was made from Al's cape and his victims he had the same powers as spawn but with electricity as he was a machine. He was killed by spawn but came back in scorched alongside Margaret love who became his lover after he saved her from demons in hell. 
 Luciano Bartino- a member of the mafia and the one who made Overtkill.
 Court of Priests- a group of cultists made up of Spawn recurring rogues.
 The Agent- Ispector skies.
 Extractor- a superpowered bounty hunter.
 Saboteur- a new villain who appeared as a leader of renagade angels.
 Behemoth- a large and powerful demon in the king spawn series.
 The Offering- an angel at war with Brimestone.
 Mandarin Spawn- A former abused deformend citizen from anicent china He would become the mandarin spawn and get his revenge becoming a foe for the Scorched.
 Barbatos- a demord who once served cog before he left.
 Sandalphon- a fallen angel trapped in the void.
 Cataclysm- the new ruler of hell after cog left.
 The Brute- a large angel leading a team attacking gunslinger.
 Mccarver- a man who experimented on Gunslinger.
 Exodus Corporation- a large corporation responsible for  Jason wynn becoming disruptor.
 Mr. Merrival- a member of Exodus obsessed with cutting people for their brains.
 Sandra- Merrival's assistant.
  Bateman Merrival- Merrival's son
  Tar Merrival- merrival's daughter

References
3. Inez Hedges, "Oneiric Fausts," in  Framing Faust: Twentieth-Century Cultural Struggles (Carbondale: Southern University Press,2005), 179-80.

 
Spawn
Characters created by Todd McFarlane
Angels in popular culture